Snellman is an unincorporated community in Becker County, Minnesota, United States.

The community is located between Detroit Lakes and Park Rapids on Minnesota State Highway 34.

References

Unincorporated communities in Minnesota
Unincorporated communities in Becker County, Minnesota